Ghostface Killahs is the thirteenth studio album by American rapper Ghostface Killah. The album was released on September 6, 2019, by Now Generation Music Corporation. The album features guest appearances from Method Man, Cappadonna, Inspectah Deck, Harley, Sun God, Shawn Wigs, Solomon Childs, Eamon and Masta Killa. Ghostface Killahs was mixed by Josh Gannet.

Critical reception

Ghostface Killahs received generally positive reviews from critics. At Metacritic, which assigns a normalized rating out of 100 to reviews from critics, the album received an average score of 71, which indicates "generally favorable reviews", based on 4 reviews.

Track listing
All tracks are produced by Danny Caiazzo.

Charts

References

2019 albums
Ghostface Killah albums